is a Japanese manga series written and illustrated by Sana Kirioka. It was serialized in Shueisha's Jump Square from July 2015 to September 2017, with its chapters collected in five tankōbon volumes. An anime television series adaptation by SynergySP aired from October to December 2021.

Plot
It is late 1921, the 10th year of the Taishō era. Tamahiko Shima, second son of the wealthy Shima family, has his life turned upside-down after his right arm is paralyzed in a car accident that also claims the life of his mother. Now seen as worthless to his calculating father's long-term plans for his business empire, his family treats him as “dead”. But since it would bring shame to the family were they to disown him outright, he instead finds himself shunted off to a villa in the mountains of Chiba, out of public view. Though he quickly resigns himself to the idea that he will die alone and forgotten, one snowy December night a girl appears at his doorstep and announces that she is there to be his live-in caretaker, and when she is old enough, his bride. The girl, named Yuzuki Tachibana, or “Yuzu” for short, was purchased from her impoverished home by Tamahiko's father, and while she too finds herself uprooted from her home and family, she throws herself into her new role with gusto.

Tamahiko is initially extremely cynical and depressed due to his exile, and Yuzuki's irrepressibly sunny disposition grates on his nerves at first, but her presence gradually helps brighten his mood. In time, Tamahiko and Yuzuki fall in love. In 1922, Tamahiko's younger sister, Tamako, visits the couple, and, though initially cold, warms up to Yuzuki. They also meet Ryō Atsumi, the older sister and caretaker of a number of younger siblings, who teases, picks on and steals from Tamahiko. However, she grows close to him and Yuzuki, and Tamahiko helps her younger siblings with school.

In 1923, Yuzuki and one of Ryō's brothers, Ryotaro, leave for Tokyo - the former to see her friend from school, and the latter to pursue an apprenticeship. However, they are caught up in the 1923 Great Kantō earthquake, leading Tamahiko and Ryō to walk to Tokyo, with Tamahiko leaving his house open as a temporary shelter for the affected population in his town. Tamahiko finds Yuzuki, bringing her to a temporary hospital run by his estranged uncle. After the earthquake, the famous singer Kotori Shiratori visits Chiba and plays a show with Yuzuki and Ryō attending. Later on, Tamahiko returns to school, passing the entrance exams and making friends with Kotori's twin brother, Hakaru. Kotori visits Yuzuki and Tamahiko and asks them about love to support her songwriting.

Yuzuki suddenly leaves one day, and Tamahiko falls back into his depressed state. It is revealed that the heir to the Shima family, Tamaki, has died, and Tamahiko, despite being previously ostracized, is invited back into the family to serve as heir. As a result, Yuzuki is assigned to become the wife of Tamahiko's brother Tamao. Tamahiko goes back to Tokyo, gets Yuzuki back, and cuts ties with his father, with Tamako and Tamao following him, leaving only the oldest sister, Tamayo, to succeed the Shima family. In preparation for their wedding, Tamahiko and Yuzuki visit Yuzuki's family in Iwate. Eventually, Tamahiko takes Yuzuki's last name, Tachibana, and becomes a teacher. Tamao and Tamako are adopted by their uncle.

Characters

Taisho Otome Fairy Tale

, Daisy Guevara (Young)
The viewpoint character of the series. Second son of the wealthy and calculating Shima family in Tokyo, Tamahiko is in a car crash that kills his mother and robs him of the use of his dominant right hand. Deemed worthless by his father, he is banished to his family's mountain retreat in Chiba. Filled with self-loathing and resigned to his fate to live and die in ignominy, he is slowly dragged out of his depression when Yuzuki comes into his life. He develops a deep attachment towards her and falls in love with her, although he wants to become a better person before marrying her. When his older brother dies and it becomes clear Yuzuki will be taken away in order for him to become the new Shima family heir, he severs ties to the family, marries Yuzuki, and they have three children. Having a knack at tutoring children, he later becomes an elementary school teacher.

The otome ("maiden") of the title. At fourteen years old, she leaves the girls' school she had been attending when her debt-ridden family sells her to the Shima family for a (then-)princely sum of ¥10,000 to be Tamahiko's caretaker and future bride. Endlessly upbeat, she sees the kindness under Tamahiko's sour exterior and is determined to bring him out of his shell through her sheer devotion. She quickly becomes fond of him as she sees he is sincere and more kind that he lets on. She quickly falls in love with him and is determined to be his wife. Despite his family's attempt to separate the two in order to force Tamahiko to return to the family, the two elope and live poorly but happily, and have three children together.

Tamako is Tamahiko's younger sister and the youngest of the Shima children. She is bratty and domineering thanks to her luxurious upbringing, but underneath lies a sensitive and caring child. Her lonely childhood made her unable to trust others. Her time at her brother's villa allows her to form a true bond with him and they reconcile. She also bonds with Yuzuki, seeing her as an older sister. Changed by the couple, she decides to become a doctor and moves in with her uncle. Although annoyed by Hakaru, she grows close to him and marries him.

An eighteen year old delinquent girl who lives in a nearby town. Living with three younger brothers, she picks pockets to provide for them and shields them from their abusive father, who once tried to sell her into prostitution. She meets Tamahiko while robbing his estate, but they become friendlier when he begins tutoring her brothers. She later develops feelings for him but doesn't pursue them due to his love for Yuzuki. She initially hates Yuzuki for being happy despite being sold for money, but comes to respect her positivity and resilience.

A famous singer, whom Yuzuki and Tamako, and later Tamahiko, are fans of. After watching her perform for the locals, she befriends the three. She also seeks advice from Yuzuki in writing a love song.

Kotori's twin brother. He befriends Tamahiko after he returns to high school. He used to be a musician like his sister but quit after battling an illness for three years. He becomes acquainted with Tamako when the two start volunteering at her uncle's hospital. They later form a relationship and get married.

Father of Tamahiko, Tamako, Tamaki, Tamayo and Tamao. A ruthless man, he is indifferent towards his family and sees money and privilege as the ultimate success. His cruelty is such that he cast Tamahiko off for his disability and had him declared dead, he allows Tamayo to torture her siblings, and he shows no concern for his children's well being if it doesn't benefit him.

Eldest child of the Shima family, and older brother of Tamahiko, Tamako, Tamayo, and Tamako. He is injured in the Great Kanto Earthquake but later dies after being poisoned by Tamayo.

The second eldest child of the Shima family. She is just as ruthless as her father to where she takes delight in stealing and or killing anything that brings happiness to others. She is particularly cruel to her siblings, who fear her. She desires nothing more than to have her father's attention all to herself and succeed him as the new head of the family at any cost. She adopts Jintaro Shima but he runs away due to her abuse and turns her over to the police for her crimes. She contracts turberculosis and dies while awaiting trial.

The fourth child of the Shima children. However he is revealed to be illegitimate son of Tamasuke Shima and Touko Shima. He initially hates Tamahiko for surviving the accident that killed their mother but they later reconcile. He later leaves the Shima name behind and moves in with his birth father in preparation of taking over his hospital.

A feline that lives on Tamahiko's estate. Yuzu calls the cat "Haru".

Yuzuki's best friend from her all girls school before she was sold. The two kept in touch by exchanging letters. Yuzuki visits her in Tokyo when Midori writes she is getting married due to her pregnancy.

The oldest of Ryō's younger brothers. Since their father is an abusive alcoholic, he tries to look out for his siblings. He is especially protective of Ryō because he knows how far she goes to provide for the family. He eventually leaves to become a laborer in Tokyo.

One of Ryo's younger brothers.

One of Ryo's younger brothers.

Tamahiko's paternal uncle. He left the Shima family after Tamayoshi stole his lover and forced her to marry him. He is a doctor and is married to an unnamed woman, whose surname he adopted. He is supportive of Tamahiko and Tamako, and later takes Tamao in when he learns he is his biological son.

Yuzuki's mother is a kind woman who worried after Yuzuki was bought by the Shima family to support the family. She later becomes pregnant before Yuzuki reunites with her parents and introduces them to Tamahiko.

Shōwa Otome Otogibanashi

A distant member of the Shima family and Tamayo's adoptive son. After being sent away by his parents and abused by Tamayo, Jintaro returns to his hometown to see his childhood friend and love, Tokoyo, before attempting suicide. However, he falls back in love with her, they fake their deaths to escape from Tamayo, and turn Tamayo over to the police. The pair get married and open their own parlor house before Jintaro is drafted into WWll. He is presumed to have been killed in combat but survives. Jintaro and Tokoyo later have a son.

Jintaro's childhood friend and lover. Due to being abused by her stepmother, she becomes dependent on Jintaro to the point she prefers death if she can't be with him. She works hard to regain his heart and the two run away to escape from Tamayo. Tokoyo contracts turberculosis. She marries Jintaro before he is drafted into WWll and she almost commits suicide when he is presumed dead but is overjoyed when she learns he is alive. They later have a son.

The daughter of Jintaro's patron. She is infatuated with him and sees Tokoyo as a rival for his attention. Although she accepts Jintaro will never reciprocate her feelings, she believes her feelings will never change.

Tamahiko and Yuzuki's son and first child. He resembles his father. He is a mature and pleasant boy.

A miko at the shrine of the Arima Onsen Inn Tokoyo and Jintaro live and work at. She becomes friends with Tokoyo and despises men. She is secretly in love with Tokoyo.

Media

Manga
Taisho Otome Fairy Tale, written and illustrated by Sana Kirioka, ran in Shueisha's Jump Square magazine from July 4, 2015, to September 4, 2017. Shueisha collected its chapters in five tankōbon volumes, released from February 4, 2016, to October 4, 2017.

A sequel, titled , was serialized on Shueisha's Shōnen Jump+ online magazine from August 21, 2018, to May 12, 2020. Shueisha collected its chapters in five tankōbon volumes, released from January 4, 2019, to July 3, 2020.

A spin-off series, titled , was serialized on Shōnen Jump+ from July 3 to December 31, 2021. Shueisha released the first volume on October 4, 2021. Volume 2 was March 4, 2022.

Volume list

Taisho Otome Fairy Tale

Shōwa Otome Fairy Tale

Taishō Otome Otogibanashi: Pessimist no Shokutaku

Anime
On December 20, 2020, at the Jump Festa '21 online event, it was announced that the series would receive an anime television series adaptation by SynergySP. It is directed by Jun Hatori, with scripts written by Hiroko Fukuda and Mayu Watanabe designing the characters.  Yasuharu Takanashi is composing the series' music. It aired from October 9 to December 25, 2021, on TV Tokyo, TVO, BS11, and AT-X. Garnidelia performed the opening theme , while Shun'ichi Toki performed the ending theme . Ayasa Itō performed the ending theme  of episode 12. Funimation licensed the series while Muse Communication licensed it in Southeast Asia.

Episode list

Reception
The anime adaptation's first episode garnered mixed reviews from Anime News Network's staff during the Fall 2021 season previews. Richard Eisenbeis critiqued that a familiarity with the Taisho era is needed to enjoy the show and that Yuzuki's characteristics made her more of a plot device for Tamahiko's story, calling it "a perfectly watchable anime" that he had little reason to continue watching it. Nicholas Dupree understood the fluffy approach the show was going for but felt it lacked bite to explore its given topics and make its couple more romantically engaging beyond trite sentiment, concluding that: "Overall this is a perfectly pleasant experience, but one I'm not interested in repeating." James Beckett observed that while the show had "a decent period setting and a couple of chuckle-worthy jokes", he criticized the main couple for lacking chemistry with each other and the marriage angle for overusing an arc that's bereft of mature storytelling, saying that audiences who prefer "a perfectly nice, unambitious take" on historical romance will enjoy it. Rebecca Silverman wrote that: "While this isn't treading any new ground, there's a sort of wholesome charm to it. That goes a long way to making up for hackneyed plots or lines and the simple, at times lackluster artwork. At its heart this is a familiar story about two people coming to care for each other and overcome the obstacles life has seen fit to throw in their way. As long as it keeps that heart warm and beating, this could be a quiet charmer of a show."

Fellow ANN editor Caitlin Moore reviewed the complete anime series in 2022 and gave it a B– grade. She praised the "pleasant and cheerful" narrative, the exploration of damaged people navigating the world and finding solace in one's community and its depiction of Tamahiko's disability, but was critical of Yuzuki's "one-dimensional[ly] cheery" demeanor lacking interiority during her situation and the "lackluster visual direction" failing to further elevate the story, concluding that: "Overall, Taisho Otome Fairy Tale is a nice enough series, but it's held back by a hesitation to venture into anything beyond nice ... As it is, it's good as a relaxing watch if you're tired of the "cute girls doing cute things" rigmarole, or if you're looking for something with well-handled disability representation."

Notes

References

External links
 
  

2021 anime television series debuts
Anime series based on manga
Funimation
Historical anime and manga
Muse Communication
Romance anime and manga
Shōnen manga
Shueisha manga
Taishō period in fiction
Television shows set in Chiba Prefecture
TV Tokyo original programming